Parascolopsis eriomma, commonly known as rosy dwarf monocle bream, is a fish native to the Indian and western Pacific Oceans.

Appearance
Parascolopsis eriomma has a rosy-coloured back with a diffuse yellow longitudinal band right along the middle of its side. It can grow to 30cm in length.

Habitat and distribution
This bream inhabits offshore trawling grounds in waters throughout the Indo-West Pacific.

References

Miyamoto, K., C.D. McMahan and A. Kaneko, 2020. Parascolopsis akatamae, a new species of dwarf monocle bream (Perciformes: Nemipteridae) from the Indo-West Pacific, with redescription of closely related species P. eriomma. Zootaxa 4881(1):91-103.

Fish of Thailand
Fish of Japan
Fish of Indonesia
Fish of the Pacific Ocean
Fish of the Indian Ocean
Taxa named by David Starr Jordan
Taxa named by Robert Earl Richardson
Fish described in 1909
Nemipteridae